Middle Spring Creek is a  tributary of the Conodoguinet Creek in Franklin and Cumberland counties in Pennsylvania in the United States.

The stream runs through the heart of Shippensburg and into Franklin County.

Middle Spring Creek joins the Conodoguinet just south of a village named Mowersville.

See also
List of rivers of Pennsylvania

References

External links
U.S. Geological Survey: PA stream gaging stations

Rivers of Pennsylvania
Tributaries of the Susquehanna River
Rivers of Cumberland County, Pennsylvania
Rivers of Franklin County, Pennsylvania